Timothy G. O’Connell (1868–1955) was an American architect whose Boston-based practice specialized in ecclesiastical design.

O'Connell is reputed to have produced some 600 civic and religious buildings. Some of these structures such as the Church of Sts. Peter and Paul in Lewiston, Maine would rival any medieval cathedral in form and scale. Unfortunately little is currently known of this architect and his work. When he closed his office in Boston in the 1950s he destroyed all of his records and drawings.

Childhood and education

O'Connell was born in Fort Dodge, Iowa in 1868. Two years later his family moved to Newburyport, Massachusetts, where he attended public grammar school and the Immaculate Conception High School. While there the local clergyman, Fr. Mortimer Twomey, encouraged the youth to study architecture. O'Connell is said to have taken some courses at MIT but never received a degree from that school.

Architectural practice

The first building that O’Connell designed was a church in Twin Mountain, New Hampshire (1890). In 1901 he became the junior partner of the firm Chickering and O’Connell, with George W. Chickering. The firm had offices in Manchester, New Hampshire and Springfield, Massachusetts. At one time Chickering and O'Connell employed up to 60 draftsmen, and they designed churches for the Episcopal denomination as well as Catholics.

From 1911 onward O’Connell worked on his own. He married in 1921 and in 1924 took a business partner, Richard J. Shaw, who had graduated from the Harvard School of Design in 1912 and would later design the famous Hatch Memorial Shell in Boston. The new firm, known as O’Connell and Shaw, was located in Boston and lasted for six years. Thereafter Mr. O'Connell and Mr. Shaw continued practice under their own names.

Selected work 
(with Chickering and O’Connell)
 Immaculate Conception Church (1897) Penacook NH
St. John Church Millers Falls, MA
Our Lady Help of Christians Church (Currently The New Church of Concord), West Concord, MA
St. Francis Xavier Church, now home of St Mary and Archangel Michael Coptic Orthodox Church , Nashua, NH
St. George Church, Dover, NH
 St. Mary Church, Hillsborough, NH
 St. Kieran Church Berlin, NH
 St. Patrick Church, Monson, MA
 Star of the Sea Church, York Beach, ME
 St. Louis Church, Auburn, ME
 St. Andre Church, Biddeford, ME
 St. Louis Church, Fort Kent, ME
 St. David Church, Madawaska, ME
 St. Joseph Academy, Portland, ME
 St. Paul Church, Warren, MA
 St. Ann Church, Waterbury, CT
 Sacred Heart Church, Taftville, CT (1916 church burned in 1958, replaced by M. George Vinovich)
 St. Lawrence O'Toole Church, Lawrence, MA (demolished in the 1970s)
 St. Stanislus Church, New Haven, Connecticut
 St. Joseph Academy, Portland, ME
 St. Joseph Church, Meriden, Connecticut

(with O’Connell and Shaw)

 St. Andrew Church, Forest Hills, MA
 St. Polycarp Church, Somerville, MA
 St. Mary Italian Church, Salem, MA
 Sacred Heart Church, Yarmouth, ME
 St. Mary Church,  Biddeford, ME
 St. Mary Church,  Lewiston, ME
 St. Mary Church,  Augusta, ME
 Our Lady of Sorrows Church, Hartford, CT
 St. Peter and St. Paul Basilica, Lewiston, ME
 Sacred Heart Church, Waterville, ME
 Brighton High School, Brighton, MA
 Grover Cleveland School, Dorchester, MA
 St. Mary Church, Stamford, CT
 St. Mary Church, Norwich, CT
 John Bapst High School, Bangor, ME
 St. Lawrence O'Toole Church, Hartford, Connecticut (replaced by new building, Russell Hills of John J. McMahon Inc. supervising architect)

(as T. G. O’Connell)

 unnamed Church, Twin Mountain, NH
 SS. Cyril and Methodius Church, Hartford, Connecticut
 St. Andrew Church, Billerica, MA
 St. Pius V Church,  Lynn, MA
 St. Mary by the Sea, Biddeford Point, ME
 St. Augustine Church, Augusta, ME
 St. Mary Church, Westbrook, ME
 St. Mary of the Harbor Church, Boothbay Harbor, ME
 St. Mary Church, Meriden, Connecticut
 St. Aloysius Church New Canaan, Connecticut (now theParish Center)

References

1868 births
1955 deaths
Architects from Boston
Architects from Iowa
Architects of Roman Catholic churches
People from Fort Dodge, Iowa
People from Newburyport, Massachusetts
20th-century American architects